Ziv Carmon is the Dean of Research, Professor of Business Administration, and holder of The Alfred H. Heineken Chaired Professorship at INSEAD. An expert in human judgment and decision-making, he is best known for his research on placebo effects of commercial actions and on the endowment effect, and his presentations and teachings about Customer Insight.

Career
After working in sales and business analysis in the corporate world, he studied in the United States at University of California at Berkeley, where he received his MS in Business Administration and his PhD with a thesis entitled The Contingent Nature of Consumers Assessments of the Quality of Products and Services  under the guidance of Nobel Laureate Daniel Kahneman and Itamar Simonson. Carmon began his academic career at the Duke University in 1993 as assistant professor at the Fuqua School of Business, where in 1997 he became associate professor. In 2000 he moved to France, to teach at INSEAD, and moved in 2004 to Singapore.

Carmon is a frequent speaker at professional conferences and business events. His views on business frequently appear in international media outlets such as: New York Times, The Washington Post, Los Angeles Times, The New Yorker, Forbes, The Wall Street Journal, Financial Times, Scientific American, Popular Science, Bloomberg Businessweek, Newsweek, USA Today, The Huffington Post, The Boston Globe, International Herald Tribune, Marketing News, The Times (UK), The Guardian (UK), The Daily Telegraph (UK), Toronto Star, Newsweek, National Public Radio, MSNBC, ABC News, Channel 4 (UK), and numerous blogs.

Awards and honors
Carmon’s research on placebo effects of marketing actions won the 2010 William F. O'Dell Award (for long-term contribution to marketing theory, methodology, and/or practice), was runner-up for the 2006 Paul Green Award (for showing the most potential to contribute significantly to marketing research practice and research in marketing), and was also chosen as one of the top 50 management articles of 2005 by Emerald Management Reviews (awarded to the 50 most notable out of the 15,000 articles that year).

His papers on Indeterminacy and the Live TV, and on Option Attachment, were finalists for the 2009 and 2006 Journal of Consumer Research Best Article Awards.

In 2008 Carmon, along with his co-authors, Rebecca Waber, Dan Ariely and Baba Shiv, was awarded an Ig Nobel Prize in medicine for their research demonstrating that high-priced placebos are more effective than low-priced ones. Carmon serves as Consulting Editor for the Journal of Behavioral Decision Making, served as Associate Editor for the Journal of Marketing Research, and is a member of the editorial review boards of a variety of other major journals, such as the Journal of Consumer Research, the Journal of Consumer Psychology, & the International Journal of Research in Marketing.

Carmon has taught in many countries around the world, in degree programs (Executive MBA, MBA, and PhD), numerous executive-education-programs (company-specific-, in-house-, open-enrollment), and received a variety of awards for teaching excellence.

Selected works

References

Israeli marketing people
Academic staff of INSEAD
Duke University faculty
1961 births
Haas School of Business alumni
Technion – Israel Institute of Technology alumni
Living people